You Take My Breath Away may refer to:

 "You Take My Breath Away" (Rex Smith song), 1979
 "You Take My Breath Away" (The Knife song), 2003
 "You Take My Breath Away", a song by Claire Hamill
 "You Take My Breath Away", a song by Design
 "You Take My Breath Away", a song by Lange under the name SuReaL
 "You Take My Breath Away", a song by Sarah Brightman from Fly
 "You Take My Breath Away", a song by Queen from A Day at the Races

See also
 Take My Breath Away (disambiguation)